The Islamic Dawa Party – Iraq Organisation (Arabic: Ḥizb al Daʿwa al-Islāmiyya - Tanzim al-Iraq) is a political party in Iraq which is a component of the United Iraqi Alliance. It split from the Islamic Dawa Party during the regime of Saddam Hussein when most of the leaders of Dawa were in exile. It was allocated 12 seats by the Alliance after the elections in December 2005. It is led by Hashim Al-Mosawy, who is its Secretary-General. The head of the parliamentary bloc of the party is Kasim Muhammad Taqi al-Sahlani.

The Islamic Dawa Party was formed in 1957 in the Iraqi holy City of Najaf. Their aim was to create a movement which would promote Islamic values and ethics, and which would become an instrument for political activeness. This came at a time when there was widespread ignorance about religion and politics in Iraq. Mohammad Baqir al-Sadr laid out the foundations for the party and its political ideology, based on Wilayat Al-Umma (Governance of the people).

References

Adawa Newspaper
Al Masar TV

Islamic political parties in Iraq
Shia Islamic political parties
Islamic Dawa Party